Maack may refer to:

 Ferdinand Maack (1861–1930), inventor of Raumschach
 Herb Maack (1917–2007), head coach of the Rhode Island Rams football team
 Reinhard Maack (1892–1969), German explorer, geologist and geographer
 Richard Maack (1825–1886), Russian naturalist, geographer, and anthropologist

Low German surnames